Pilsener may refer to:

 anything from the town of Plzeň or Pilsen
 Pilsner, a type of beer
 Beer glassware#Pilsner glass, a variety of beer glass 
 Mash ingredients#Pilsner malt, a type of brewing malt 
 Prohibition_in_Iceland#Pre-abolition, non-alcoholic beer in Iceland during prohibition, usually mixed in such drinks as bjórlíki, a legal beer substitute
 Old Style Pilsner, a beer brewed in Canada by Molson's popularly known simply as Pilsner in regions where it is widely consumed